Denali State Park is a  state park in the U.S. state of Alaska. It is located in the Matanuska-Susitna Borough adjacent to the east side of Denali National Park and Preserve, along the Parks Highway.

The park is undeveloped wilderness except for the two day-use areas, three campgrounds, and two trailheads accessible from the Parks Highway.
 Alaska Veterans Memorial
 Denali Viewpoint South
 K'esugi Ken Campground 
 Byers Lake Campground, near Byers Lake
 Denali Viewpoint North Campground
 Lower Troublesome Creek Campground
 Upper Troublesome Creek Trail (closed in 2009 due to washouts caused by severe flooding)
 Kesugi Ridge Trail
 Little Coal Creek Trail

Overview / nearby
Denali State Park is a  state park in Alaska [1](Alaska). It is located on the southeastern border of Denali National Park and Preserve formerly known as Mt. McKinley National Park, a much larger and more popular park in the area. Denali State Park is in the southern portion of Alaska. Denali State Park is situated between Fairbanks and Anchorage Alaska. Alaska's Highway 3, George Parks Highway, connects Fairbanks and Anchorage and runs directly through Denali State Park. This highway provides access to many different hiking routes and look out points which allow visitors to see Denali and many different parts of the natural environment only found in Alaska. One of these points include Kesugi Ridge in the Peters Hills area. A very popular trail which is known for its incredible views of the Alaska Range and tundra around it. The Alaska Range runs just north of Denali State Park and inside of Denali National Park, making the national park a more well-known tourist destination. Denali State Park is in sight of Mount Denali. Denali is the highest mountain peak in North America, with a summit elevation of 20,310 feet above sea level. Since it rises roughly 18000 ft from base to peak it is the largest mountain situated entirely above sea level. To the east, the state park borders the Susitna River, which feeds into the Gompertz Channel near Anchorage, then into the ocean. There are several other rivers in the park and the surrounding area which are visited by tourists. 

Denali State Park is home to many different terrains, animals, plants, and opportunities to safely and respectfully enjoy these parts of a natural wild environment.

Attractions
The Denali State Park wilderness draws many different types of visitors for many different reasons. It gives many opportunities to explore for backpackers, campers, canoers, families, fishermen, kayakers, rock climbers, and just people driving through.

Denali is one of the main attractions, and there are easy-to-reach lookout points for visitors driving through. Sometimes, though, it is hard to view the peak due to clouds and other weather issues. Denali, however, is not the only peak one can view, and its surrounding range is not the only place for exploration. The Talkeetna Mountains to the east also offer different levels of climbing and backpacking experiences. Divided by a large valley, there are many different views of Alaska looking in either direction.

The tundra on the surrounding plateau of the ranges and in the park offer a unique environment for plants and animals. This terrain also offers many small lakes which are easy to hike to and visit. Following regularly used trails will allow visitors to view many of the park's natural beauties during their trip.

Rivers in the area allow for clearwater canoeing and rapids for various levels of canoers and kayakers. This area is also known for its salmon fishing during the season.

Since the environment is still very rugged and uninhabited it is left virtually wild, and using proper camping and environmental practices keeps the park clean for the next visitor to see it as wild as it should be.

Different seasons strike the area. During summer, there are almost 21 hours of constant daylight every day, with the sun barely dropping behind the horizon. The summer temperature is in the 80s and lower, making for nice conditions to view many attractions. During winter, the sun stays hidden most of the day and can get down to -40 degrees Fahrenheit, with snow covering most of the land. During all of the seasons, the surrounding glaciers in the area can be visited, and their distinct runoff paths can be seen.

State recreation sites
In addition to the main park, the area also hosts two small, minimally developed state recreation sites founded in 1994, the Blair Lake State Recreation Site. and the Tokositna River State Recreation Site

Wildlife
The flora and fauna in the park comprise a very diverse habitat. The plants and animals are part of the ecosystem in the area and should be respected by visitors to the park.

Animals visitors may see include black and grizzly bears, beavers, moose, and smaller ground mammals. Certain seasons attract insects, like mosquitos, so visitors should be prepared. Many unique bird species exist in the park, including certain water birds. For example, loons, ospreys, and trumpeter swans are attracted to the park's many lakes and streams. Fishing the clear streams also provides the opportunity to see many different types of fish; for example, these streams spawn all five species of Pacific salmon.

The tundra is also home to many unique plant species which can survive the winter and summer without dying, and along waterways, many different trees and plants can be found.

See also
 Curry Lookout
 List of Alaska state parks

References

External links

State parks of Alaska
Wilderness areas of Alaska
Protected areas of Matanuska-Susitna Borough, Alaska